Axis Bank Limited, formerly known as UTI Bank (1993–2007), is an Indian banking and financial services company headquartered in Mumbai, Maharashtra. It sells financial services to large and mid-size companies, SMEs and retail businesses.

As of 30 June 2016, 30.81% shares are owned by the promoters and the promoter group (United India Insurance Company Limited, Oriental Insurance Company Limited, National Insurance Company Limited, New India Assurance Company Ltd, GIC, LIC and UTI). The remaining 69.19% shares are owned by mutual funds, FIIs, banks, insurance companies, corporate bodies and individual investors.

History
The bank was founded on 3 December 1993 as UTI Bank, opening its registered office in Ahmedabad and a corporate office in Mumbai. The bank was promoted jointly by the Administrator of the Unit Trust of India (UTI), Life Insurance Corporation of India (LIC), General Insurance Corporation, National Insurance Company, The New India Assurance Company, The Oriental Insurance Corporation and United India Insurance Company. The first branch was inaugurated on 2 April 1994 in Ahmedabad by Manmohan Singh, then finance minister of India.

In 2001 UTI Bank agreed to merge with Global Trust Bank, but the Reserve Bank of India (RBI) withheld approval and the merger did not take place. In 2004, the RBI put Global Trust under moratorium and supervised its merger with Oriental Bank of Commerce. The following year, UTI bank was listed on the London Stock Exchange. In the year 2006, UTI Bank opened its first overseas branch in Singapore. The same year it opened an office in Shanghai, China. In 2007, it opened a branch in the Dubai International Financial Centre and branches in Hong Kong.

On 30 July 2007, UTI Bank changed its name to Axis Bank.

In 2009, Shikha Sharma was appointed as the MD and CEO of Axis Bank.

In 2013, Axis Bank's subsidiary, Axis Bank UK commenced banking operations.

On 1 January 2019, Amitabh Chaudhry took over as MD and CEO.

In year 2021,the Bank had reduced its stake in Yes Bank from 2.39 per cent to 1.96 per cent.

Operations

Indian Business

As of 12 August 2016, the bank had a network of 4,096 branches and extension counters and 12,922 ATMs.

Axis Bank has the largest ATM network among private banks in India. It even operates an ATM at one of the world's highest sites at Thegu, Sikkim at a height of 4,023 meters (13,200 ft) above sea level.

International business
The bank has nine international offices with branches at Singapore, Hong Kong, Dubai (at the DIFC), Shanghai, Colombo and representative offices at Dhaka, Dubai, Sharjah and Abu Dhabi, which focus on corporate lending, trade finance, syndication, investment banking and liability businesses. In addition to the above, the bank has a presence in UK with its wholly owned subsidiary Axis Bank UK Limited.

Services

Retail banking

The bank offers lending services to individuals and small businesses, along with liability products, card services, Internet banking, automated teller machines (ATM) services, depository, financial advisory services, and Non-resident Indian (NRI) services. Axis bank is a participant in RBI's NEFT enabled participating banks list.

Corporate banking
Transaction banking: Axis Bank provides products and services related to transaction banking to customers in areas of current accounts, cash management services, capital market services, trade, foreign exchange and derivatives, cross-border trade and correspondent banking services, and tax collections on behalf of the Government and various State Governments in India.

Investment banking and trustee services: The bank provides investment banking and trusteeship services through its owned subsidiaries. Axis Capital Limited provides investment banking services relating to equity capital markets, institutional stock brokering besides M&A advisory. Axis Trustee Services Limited is engaged in trusteeship activities, acting as a debenture trustee and as a trustee to various securitization trusts.

International banking

The bank offers corporate banking, trade finance, treasury and risk management through the branches at Singapore, Hong Kong, DIFC, Shanghai and Colombo, and as also retail liability products from its branches at Hong Kong and Colombo. The representative office at Dhaka was inaugurated during the current financial year.

Listing and shareholding

Axis Banks's equity shares are listed on the Bombay Stock Exchange (BSE) and National Stock Exchange of India (NSE). The company's global depository receipts (GDRs) are listed on the London Stock Exchange. The Bonds issued by the bank under the MTN program are listed on the Singapore Stock Exchange.

Issues and concerns

Operation Red Spider

An Indian online magazine conducted a sting operation which was publicised along with 2013 videos evidence showing a wide range of violations and money-laundering schemes by top officials at a number of Indian banks, including Axis Bank.

2016 Demonetisation related money laundering

Following the 2016 Indian Banknote Demonetisation, a number of Axis Bank employees were arrested for facilitating money laundering activities. Some media outlets highlighted the disproportionate number of cases involving the bank, and claimed that the bank's aggressive performance targets and internal culture fostered such activities and that the blame does not lie solely in the hands of arrested employees.

Initiatives

Axis Thought Factory
An innovation hub located in Bengaluru has an in-house innovation team and an accelerator program. With this launch, Axis Bank became the first Indian bank to introduce a dedicated innovation lab in the country.

Asha home loans
Asha home loans targets first-time home buyers in the lower-income segment.

eKYC
eKYC (electronic know your customer) is an online, paperless Aadhaar card-based process for fulfilling KYC requirements to start investing in mutual funds without the submission of any documents. Axis Bank partnered with Visa Inc. to launch the 'eKYC' facility, and was the first organization in India to introduce biometrics-based KYC.

Subsidiaries

Axis Capital Ltd. 
Axis Capital Ltd. was incorporated in India as a wholly owned subsidiary of the bank on 6 December 2005 and received its certificate of commencement of business on 2 May 2006. Certain businesses of M/s. Enam Securities Pvt. Ltd. were merged with Axis Capital Ltd. as part of a scheme and the following companies became direct subsidiaries of Axis Capital:

 Axis Securities Ltd. (formerly Enam Securities Direct Pvt. Ltd.)
 Axis Finance Ltd. (formerly Enam Finance Pvt. Ltd.)
 Axis Securities Europe Ltd. (formerly Enam Securities Europe Ltd.)
 Enam International Ltd., UAE (voluntarily dissolved with effect from 24 August 2014)

Axis Securities Ltd., Axis Finance Ltd. and Axis Securities Europe Ltd. later became direct subsidiaries of the bank in line with the RBI directives.

Axis Securities Ltd. 
Axis Securities Ltd.was incorporated in India on 21 July 2006. The sales and securities business, including the retail broking business of Axis Capital Ltd, was merged with ASL on 25 May 2013. ASL is a wholly owned subsidiary of the bank and offers retail asset products, credit cards and retail brokerage services.

Axis Private Equity Ltd. 
Axis Private Equity Ltd. was incorporated in India as a wholly owned subsidiary of the bank on 3 October 2006 and received its certificate of commencement on 4 December 2006. APE manages investments, venture capital funds and offshore funds.

Axis Mutual Fund 

Axis Mutual Fund is a subsidiary of Axis Bank established in 2009 with in headquarters in Mumbai.

Acquisitions 
Axis Bank acquired Freecharge, a digital marketplace for financial services in 2017 for approximately ₹385 crore.

Awards

2010
 Best Debt House in India – Euromoney
 Best Domestic Debt House in India – Asiamoney
 Overall Winner & Consistent Performer – (Large Banks Category) – Business Today Best Bank Awards 2010

2011
 Bank of the Year – India –The Banker Awards 2011

2012
 Bank of the Year – Money Today FPCIL Awards 2012–13
 Best Private Sector Bank – CNBC-TV18 India's Best Bank and Financial Institution Awards 2012

2013
 Ranked No 1 in the IT Biz Award – large enterprises category by Express IT Awards
 Joint winner under the ‘Most Innovative Broad Based Product Offering’ category - IBA Innovations Award.

2014
 Best Domestic Bank in India- Asiamoney Best Banks 2014
 Best Bank Award among Large Banks for IT For Business Innovation - IDRBT Banking Technology Excellence Awards 2014
 Best Bank for Rural Reach in the Private Sector and Best Retail Growth Performance in the Private Sector category – Dun & Bradstreet - Polaris Financial Technology Banking Awards 2014

2015
 Axis Bank has been adjudged winner in the Best Bank Category, Outlook Money Awards 2015
 Axis Bank awarded for the Best Security among Private Sector Banks in India by Data Security Council of India (DSCI).
 Best Domestic Bank in India – Asiamoney Best Banks 2015
 Axis Bank has been featured in Limca Book of Records 2015 for creating a National Record for its campaign – 'Plant a Sapling'
 No. 1 Promising Banking Brand of 2015, Economic Times Awards 2015

See also

 Banking in India
 List of banks in India
 Reserve Bank of India
 Indian Financial System Code
 List of largest banks
 List of companies of India
 Axis Direct

References

External links
 
 Business data for Axis Bank: Reuters Google Finance BloombergQuint

  

Banks based in Mumbai
Indian brands
Indian companies established in 1993
Banks established in 1993
Companies listed on the London Stock Exchange
NIFTY 50
BSE SENSEX
Axis Bank
1993 establishments in Maharashtra
Companies listed on the National Stock Exchange of India
Companies listed on the Bombay Stock Exchange